Purtse is a village in Lüganuse Parish, Ida-Viru County in northeastern Estonia.

Purtse is best known as the location of 16th century Purtse Castle.

Gallery

References
 

Villages in Ida-Viru County
Lüganuse Parish
Kreis Wierland